Thomas Fox (born 1995) is an Irish hurler who plays for Tipperary Senior Championship club Éire Óg Annacarty and at inter-county level with the Tipperary senior hurling team. He usually lines out as a midfielder. Fox is the nephew of former Tipperary hurler Pat Fox.

Honours

Tipperary
All-Ireland Minor Hurling Championship (1): 2012
Munster Minor Hurling Championship (1): 2012

References

1995 births
Living people
Éire Óg Annacarty hurlers
Tipperary inter-county hurlers
Waterford IT hurlers